Kenneth Jaliens (born 4 October 1957 in Paramaribo) is the current technical director of the Suriname national football team.

Coaching career
Jaliens led Suriname to stage two of the Caribbean Nations Cup 2006-07 and the 2010 FIFA World Cup qualification.

Personal life
He is married to Sheila Jaliens and is the uncle of Kew Jaliens.

References

1957 births
Living people
Surinamese footballers
Surinamese football managers
S.V. Voorwaarts players
SVB Eerste Divisie players
Suriname national football team managers
S.V. Voorwaarts managers
Sportspeople from Paramaribo

Association footballers not categorized by position